The Severn River is a  tidal river in the United States state of Virginia. It is a tributary of Mobjack Bay, which is an arm of Chesapeake Bay.

See also
List of rivers of Virginia

References

USGS Hydrologic Unit Map - State of Virginia (1974)

Coast Survey Chart: 12238

Rivers of Virginia